The Oregon Irish Famine Memorial is a memorial in Portland, Oregon's Mount Calvary Cemetery, in the United States. The 7-ton, 14-foot sculpture was designed by Brendan McGloin and dedicated in 2008. It features a sandstone cross with an Irish limestone base on a concrete foundation.

See also

 List of memorials to the Great Famine

References

External links

 Oregon Irish Famine Memorial Cross, Portland, Oregon at Waymarking

2008 establishments in Oregon
2008 sculptures
Great Famine (Ireland) monuments and memorials
Monuments and memorials in Portland, Oregon
Outdoor sculptures in Portland, Oregon
Sandstone sculptures in the United States
Southwest Portland, Oregon